Oka Oorilo (modalaina premakatha) is a 2005 Telugu romantic film directed by Ramesh Varma and starring Tarun, Saloni and Raja. The film's soundtrack is by Devi Sri Prasad.

Plot
Seenu (Tarun), Lalitha (Saloni) and Ravi (Raja) are childhood friends in a remote village. Ravi moves to town as a kid and loses contact with Seenu and Lalitha. Seenu and Lalitha grow up together and fall in love but Seenu's father opposes their love. Seenu and Lalitha run away from their homes and accidentally meet Ravi in the city. Ravi gives them shelter in his home but suddenly Seenu goes amiss. The rest of the story is all about the ending of a love story that started in a village.

Cast

Tarun as Seenu
Raja as Ravi
Saloni as Lalitha
Sunil as Seenu's servant
Chandra Mohan
Naresh
Nirosha
Hema
MS Narayana
Kalpana
Ramaraju
Yamuna
Muralidhar
Master Teja
Master Karthik
Baby Nikshipta
Jenny

Music
Music was Composed by Devi Sri Prasad and Released by Aditya Music.

Reception
A critic from Sify opined that "Though the first half is entertaining, the second half drags".

References

2005 films
2000s Telugu-language films

Films directed by Ramesh Varma
Films scored by Devi Sri Prasad